Andy Hines (born March 22, 1962) is an American futurist, head of graduate studies in Foresight at the University of Houston, and author of several books on strategic foresight.
Hines is a professional futurist, co-creator of the framework foresight method, Assistant Professor and Program Coordinator of the Graduate Program in Foresight at the University of Houston, Principal of foresight consulting firm Hinesight, and former organizational futurist at Kellogg Company and Dow Chemical. He has written extensively on futures studies, strategic foresight, foresight research methods, the role of organizational futurists, and the consumer landscape.

Professional career
Hines joined Joseph Coates of Coates & Jarratt, Inc as a consulting futurist in 1990. He then spent a decade crafting the role of an organizational futurist with The Kellogg Company as Senior Manager of Global Trends and thereafter at The Dow Chemical Company as Senior Ideation Leader. He returned to foresight consulting as a managing director at Social Technologies (Innovaro) and simultaneously joined the faculty of the University of Houston as a Lecturer for the then Future Studies Graduate Program in 2005. In 2010 he established his own foresight consulting firm, Hinesight, which continues to operate.  After the retirement of Peter Bishop in 2013, he was appointed as the current Program Coordinator and now Associate Professor for the Graduate Program in Foresight at the University of Houston, teaching various courses in futures studies and serving as advisor to Foresight students. He is also founding chair, Executive Director, and long-time Board member of the Association of Professional Futurists. He is a member of the World Futures Studies Federation Accreditation Council for Foresight programs that was launched in 2021. 

Hines’ published contributions including a regular column called “Hinesight” in the journal Foresight, originate from his specialty in integrating foresight into organizations. He also explored the role of shifting personal values in understanding the consumer landscape, which consequently was the topic of his book Consumershift: How Changing Values Are Reshaping the Consumer Landscape published in 2011. Hines has delivered more than 350 keynotes, presentations, and workshops on futures-related topics for clients in business, government, and non-profits. He designs and facilitates workshops using a variety of foresight methods, including the “framework foresight” method with he developed together with Peter Bishop, for the purposes of innovation, strategy development, new business and product development. The “Framework Foresight” method is captured in the 2nd edition of Thinking about the Future. Among his many clients are The Hershey Company, Library of Congress, Nissan, California Peace Officer Standards and Training (POST), CableLabs, the Lumina Foundation, Clorox, and the MD Anderson Cancer Center.
•	Associate Professor & Program Coordinator, Graduate Program in Foresight, University of Houston, 2013–Present
•	Principal, Hinesight, 2010–Present
•	Fellow, GAO Center for Strategic Foresight, Washington DC, 2018-presetn
•	Fulbright Fellowship, “Internationalization of Higher Education,” Bureau at Higher Education Commission (OHEC), Thailand Ministry of Education, Bangkok, May 24-June 22, 2019.
•	Most Significant Futures Work, Methods and Practice, Association of Professional Futurists, 2017 [Let’s Talk about Success: A Proposed Foresight Outcomes Framework for Organizational Futurists]
•	Director and Managing Director, Innovaro Social Technologies, 2006-2010
•	Co-Founder, Chair and Board Member, Association of Professional Futurists, 2001-2010
•	Lecturer & Adjunct Faculty, Graduate Program in Futures Studies, University of Houston, 2005–Present
•	Futurist & Ideation Leader, The Dow Chemical Company, 2000-2005
•	North American Trends Program Manager and Global Trends Sr. Manager, The Kellogg Company, 1997-1998, 1998-1999
•	Contributing Editor, The Futurist, 1996-1997
•	Future Research Analyst and Partner, Coates & Jarratt, Inc., 1990-1996

Education
 Ph.D. (foresight), Leeds Metropolitan University, 2012. 
 Hines’ research and dissertation explored the Role of an Organizational Futurist in Integrating Foresight into Organizations.  
 M.S. (future studies), University of Houston-Clear Lake, 1990.

Selected works
Books

 Slaughter, R. (Ed.) & Hines, A. (Assoc. Ed.) (2020). The Knowledge Base of Futures Studies 2020. Association of Professional Futurists. 
 Thinking about the Future: Guidelines for Strategic Foresight, 2nd edition (co-author: Peter C. Bishop), 2015, 2007,  (2nd)   (1st)
 Teaching about the Future,(co-author: Peter C. Bishop), 2012,  - Received the 2014 Association of Professional Futurists Most Significant Futures Work Award for Methods and Practice. 
 ConsumerShift: How Changing Values Are Reshaping the Consumer Landscape, 2011, 
 2025: Science and Technology Reshapes US and Global Society, (co-author: Joseph F Coates, John Mahaffie), 1997, 
 Managing Your Future as an Association: Thinking about Trends and Working with Their Consequences, (co-author: Jennifer Jarrett, Joseph F Coates, John Mahaffie), 1994,

Selected Articles
 A. Hines, A. & J. Gold, “An organizational futurist role for integrating foresight into corporations,” Technological Forecasting and Social Change, 2015. 101, 99–111.
 A. Hines “Future-friendly design: Designing for and with future consumers,” In M. Luchs, K. S. Swann & A. Griffin (Eds.), Design thinking: New product development essentials from the PDMA (pp. 333–348). Hoboken, NJ: Wiley, (2015).  
 A.Hines & Jeff Gold, “Professionalizing foresight: Why do it, where it stands, and what needs to be done,” Journal of Futures Studies, June 2013, 17(4): 35-54
 A. Hines, “Shifting Values: Hope and Concern for ‘Waking Up,’” On the Horizon, 21 (3), 2013.
 A. Hines. “A Dozen Surprises about the Future of Work,” Employment Relations Today, Spring 2011.
 A. Hines, “How Accurate Are Your Forecasts? More Accurate Than You Might Think,” World Future Review, October/November 2009.
 A. Hines,  P. Bishop & T. Collins, “The Current State of Scenario Development: An Overview of Techniques,” Foresight, Vol. 9, #1, pp. 5–25.  (Received the 2008 Emerald Literati Awards’ Outstanding Paper accolade for best article published in Foresight). 
 A. Hines, “The Futures of Futures: A Scenario Salon,” Foresight, Vol. 5, #4, 2003.
 A. Hines, “An Audit for Organizational Futurists: 10 Questions Every Organizational Futurist Should Be Able to Answer,” Foresight, Vol. 5, #1, 2003. (Received the 2003 Emerald Literati Awards’ Outstanding Paper accolade for best article published in Foresight). 
 A. Hines. “A Practitioner’s View of the Future of Futures Studies,” Futures, Vol. 34, 2002, pp. 337–347.
 A. Hines, K. Kelly & S.  Noesen, “Viral Futures at Dow,” Futures Research Quarterly, Fall 2001.
 A. Hines,  “The Postmodern Shift and Jobs in the Future: The Coming Values Changes and the Implications for Human Resources,” Employment Relations Today, Winter 2000.
 A. Hines,  “Futurists on the ‘Inside:’ The State of Practice of Organizational Futurists,” Futures Research Quarterly, Winter 1999.
 A. Hines  “The Future of Nanotechnology,” Macmillan’s Encyclopedia of the Future, (NY: Macmillan 1996).
 A. Hines,  “A Checklist for Evaluating Forecasts,” The Futurist, November–December 1995, pp. 20–24.
 A. Hines, J. Coates & J. Mahaffie, “Technological Forecasting: 1970-1993,” Technological Forecasting & Social Change, Vol. 47, 1994, pp. 23–33.

References

External links
 Biography: Andy Hines
 Foresight Program
 Foresight Students and Alumni
 FERN Advisors
 World Future Review Editorial Board 
 Journal of Futures Studies Editorial Board
 Hinesight

Living people
American futurologists
1962 births